Francisco Daniel "Danny" Roxo (1933–1976) was a Portuguese hunter, safari guide, and soldier. Born in Mogadouro, he emigrated to Niassa Province, Portuguese Mozambique during the 1950s, where he established himself as a professional hunter. Roxo later fought in the Mozambican War of Independence against nationalist guerrillas. After Mozambican independence he served as a foreign volunteer in 32 Battalion, a Portuguese-speaking unit of the South African Army.

Early life
Daniel Roxo was born in Mogadouro, Trás-os-Montes, on 1 February 1933. As a young man he immigrated to Niassa Province in 1951, where he settled as a professional hunter and safari guide. When the Mozambican War of Independence broke out in 1964 Roxo formed his African trackers, servants, and European acquaintances into a private militia, hunting FRELIMO combatants for government bounties.

Disillusioned by Portugal's promise to hand Mozambique to Samora Machel's incoming government, Roxo supported an abortive coup d'état by anti-FRELIMO forces in Lourenço Marques on September 7, 1974. He went into exile in South Africa the following November, joining the South African Defence Force. After completing Special Forces selection, Danny was seconded to Bravo Group (later 32 Battalion).

South African military career

Operation Savannah

Bridge 14 was situated on the Nhia River, en route from Cela to Quibala. South African mechanized contingents deploying to the south had routed a unit of the People's Armed Forces for the Liberation of Angola (FAPLA) some time prior, and the retreating Angolans had demolished the existing structure. However, since Colonel Jan Breytenbach could not ascertain this from his forward positions, he ordered Roxo to conduct a more thorough reconnaissance. Roxo arrived at the river with four Eland-90 armoured cars; his patrol came under heavy mortar fire from an opposite bank and two of the vehicles withdrew, leaving Roxo's platoon to retire on foot. Having scouted the bridge alone and determined it was no longer intact, he inadvertently walked into an FAPLA ambush, but he managed to dispatch his attackers. Two escaped South African prisoners later claimed that aside from the Angolan casualties, four Cuban troops were reported killed in the encounter.

Death
During a patrol near the Okavango river, his personnel carrier struck a landmine and overturned, killing one man and crushing Roxo beneath it. The rest of the vehicle's crew tried to lift it free, but it was too heavy. Breytenbach wrote:

"Roxo, in keeping with his dauntless character, decided to make the best of things, lighting a cigarette and smoking it calmly until it was finished, then he died - still pinned beneath the Wolf. He had not complained once, nor uttered a single groan or moan, although the pain must have been excruciating."

See also
 Battle of Bridge 14
 32 Battalion (South Africa)

References

External links

Battle of Bridge 14
Danny Roxo stories and dedications

1933 births
1976 deaths
People from Mogadouro
Portuguese military personnel
South African Army personnel
Landmine victims
South African people of Portuguese descent
Recipients of the Cruz de Guerra
Portuguese emigrants to Mozambique
Mozambican emigrants to South Africa
South African military personnel of the Border War
South African military personnel killed in action
Portuguese emigrants to South Africa